Mohy al-Din is a male Muslim name composed of the elements Muhyi, meaning "reviver", and ad-Din, meaning "of the faith".

It may refer to:

People

Name 

 Muhieddine Jaroudi, Lebanese footballer
 Muhiuddin Khan (1935 - 2016), Bangladeshi author on numerous Bengali Islamic books, noted for the famous Bengali translation of the Quran.
 Al-Sayyid Muhiyudin Abu Muhammad Abdul-Qadir Gilani Al-Hasani Wal-Hussaini (1077–1166), Sufi religious figure.
Muhyi al-Dīn al-Maghribī (1220–1283), Spanish-born Arab astronomer
Muhi Al-Din Lari (died 1526), Indian or Persian miniaturist and writer.
Muhi al-Din Muhammad Aurangzeb (1618–1707), sixth Mughal Emperor
Muhyiddin of Brunei (1673–1690), 14th Sultan of Brunei
Muhyi ad-Din Muzaffar Jang Hidayat (died 1751), ruler of Hyderabad
Mohideen Baig (1919–1991), Sri Lankan musician
Mohieddin Fikini (1925–1994), Libyan politician, Prime Minister of Libya
Mohi-Din Binhendi, Emirati businessman
Mohie El Din El Ghareeb (born 1933), Egyptian, economist, politician, and businessman
Mohiddin Badsha II (1933–1989), Indian yogi
Mohydeen Izzat Quandour (born 1938), Jordanian writer
Muhiuddin Khan Alamgir (born 1942), Bangladeshi economist and politician
Mohyeldin Elzein (1943–2007), Sudanese doctor
A. B. M. Mohiuddin Chowdhury (born 1944), Bangladeshi politician
, Iranian Shia Cleric
, Iranian Shia Cleric
T. P. M. Mohideen Khan (born 1947), Indian politician
Muhyiddin Yassin (born 1947), 8th Prime Minister of Malaysia
Mohiuddin Jahangir (1948–1971), Bangladesh army officer, awarded Bir Sreshtho
Muhidin Čoralić (born 1968), Bosnian footballer
Mohiyedine Sharif (died 1998), Palestinian terrorist
Muhyi al-Din Faris (died 2008), Sudanese poet
Muhyiddin (title) Ibn Arabi (1165-1240), Andalusian mystic

Middle name 

 Ghulam Mohiuddin Khan (died 1969), sixth Prince of Arcot
 Taha Muhie-eldin Marouf (1929–2009), Iraqi-Kurdish politician
 Zia Mohiuddin Dagar (Z. M. Dagar) (1929–1990), Indian musician
 Hossein Mohyeddin Elāhi Ghomshei, or just Hossein Elahi Ghomshei (born 1940), Iranian writer on Persian literature and Iranian mysticism
 Sami Mohy El Din Muhammed Al Hajj, or just Sami al-Hajj (born 1968), Sudanese journalist held in Guantanamo
Ahmed Mohey El Din Mohamed Saleh (born 1990), Egyptian teacher
Seyed Mohyeddin Seghatoleslam (born 1960), Persian Architect

Surname 

Cauder Mohideen (active 1795), first Kapitan Keling of Penang
Makhdoom Mohiuddin (1908–1969), Indian Urdu poet and political activist
Zakaria Mohieddin (1918–2012), Egyptian military officer, politician, Prime Minister of Egypt
Khaled Mohieddin (1922–2018), Egyptian politician and soldier
Ahmed Mohiuddin (1923–1998), Pakistani scientist
Ahmad Fuad Mohieddin (1926–1984), Egyptian politician, Prime Minister of Egypt
Zia Mohyeddin (born 1933), Pakistani actor
Bawa Muhaiyaddeen (died 1986), Sri Lankan Tamil Sufi mystic
Ghulam Mohiuddin (actor) (born 1951), Pakistani actor
Sherif Mohie El Din (born 1964), Egyptian conductor and composer
Akhtar Mohiuddin, Pakistani football coach
Ayman Mohyeldin (born 1979), Egyptian-American journalist

See also
Muhiddin, Turkish surname
Mohyeddin , Given Name

References

Arabic masculine given names